Mobile phone content advertising is the promotion of ring tones, games and other mobile phone services.  Such services are usually subscription-based and use the short message service (SMS) system to join up to them.  Another method is broadcasting messages to the mobile phone's idle-screen, enabling the mobile operators or advertisers to reach millions in real-time. The advertising and sale of ring tones in particular has seen a massive growth in recent years, with some commercial breaks, particularly on music television channels and in motor racing (especially NASCAR, with Sprint Nextel as the series sponsor), being dominated by such adverts. Advertising in newspapers and magazines has also become popular.

History
The first easily customisable aspect of the mobile phone were the operator logos – small, monochrome images that show the logo of the mobile network operator (such as Vodafone) by default.  These were often replaced by a person's name or a small symbol.

As handset manufacturers introduced better ring tones and audio capabilities. The ring tones became the most common method of customising the phone.  Web sites containing ring tones of popular songs and tunes started appearing, with many of them providing the service free of charge and with little or no advertising at all – their popularity grew mainly through word of mouth.  However, these sites soon started charging a small fee for the privilege.  The next step was to advertise these services. However, since the introduction of interchangeable faceplates on mobile phones in 1998, the mobile market has shifted its advertising strategies.

Some companies started large mass media campaigns to advertise the fact that they had the latest tunes and largest collections of ring tones.  One of the biggest advertiser is the German company Jamba! (known as Jamster! in some countries), known for the Sweety the Chick and Crazy Frog ringtone characters.  After months of public complaints, the British Advertising Standards Authority (ASA) ruled on 21 September 2005 that many of the advertisements must be shown only after 9 p.m.  The primary intention of this was to prevent the company from targeting young people in its campaigns.

Trends
A new trend in mobile phone content advertising is the "ad-supported" mobile phone service model. MVNO's such as Virgin Mobile USA, Xero Mobile, and Blyk offer, or plan to offer, free or subsidized mobile phone service in exchange for subscribers viewing a number of targeted advertisements that are relevant to the subscriber. These MVNO's use a "one person per presentation" model. The relevancy of any given advertisement is based on user demographics, questionnaires, and the like. Leap Wireless International Inc. holds a patent (Owensby 6,647,257)that allows a subscriber to subsidize his/her calls by viewing advertising, and uses a number of subscriber centric factors.

While advertising via a mobile phone is still relatively new, inventors have developed ways to use a mobile phone to present advertising to persons standing near a mobile phone user while the user speaks in a non-handsfree mode. Bayne's invention (Bayne, U.S. Pat. Application Nos. 20050239448 & 20050239495)teaches providing a mobile phone user with incentives (e.g. discounted talk time, free content, etc.) for allowing the phone to be used as a mini-billboard by manipulating the main screen to face outward to present advertising (in an alternate embodiment the invention uses the rear-facing screen). This invention differs from the conventional approach of "one person per presentation", and is based on the observation that "birds of a feather flock together" to give the advertiser multiple views per presentation and a demographic that is the same, or similar to, the subscriber. Inventor Okawa (U.S. Pat. Application 20040259599) teaches a similar invention for presenting advertising to unspecified persons near a mobile phone user, using the rear screen, while the user speaks on a mobile phone. Presentation to persons other than the user will likely be used to increase market share in low-income/high-population areas, as well as provide a line extension for ad-supported MVNO's.

A new approach to mobile content advertising is the use of viral marketing. Through specially designed programmes users can send recommendations for mobile content they like to their contact lists. Passa Parola, the Italian version of Meyou, has reached a total of 800,000 registered users, by the use of viral marketing alone.

Motorsports
On 19 June 2003 NASCAR prohibited advertising by any new mobile phone companies who were not in the sport at the time;  mobile phone companies who were involved could stay with their current teams, but once they break from their current teams, they could not advertise in NASCAR's premier series.   This prohibition was a byproduct of the new ten-year contract with Nextel Communications.

Motorsport advertising has been prevalent, especially to replace tobacco;  in 2000, Alltel sponsored a car in the NASCAR Busch Series for Herzog Motorsports, and rookie driver Jimmie Johnson.  That partnership lasted only one year, as a result of Greg Penske joining the Board of Directors for Alltel.  The firm then moved its sponsorship to Penske Racing with driver Ryan Newman.  BellSouth in 1997 began advertising with Team Sabco (later Chip Ganassi Racing) before merging its mobile phone business with Southwestern Bell to form Cingular Wireless in 2001;  Cingular then joined Richard Childress Racing in 2002.  Both firms are grandfathered under NASCAR's deal with Nextel.

In Formula One, McLaren has signed a deal with Vodafone to sponsor their F1 team effective 2007.  Ferrari is reportedly signed with Telecom Italia's Alice brand of services in 2007 where the Alice brand will appear as the "primary" sponsor of the red cars where Marlboro is prohibited.

References

 Advertising Standards Authority (21 September 2005) "Broadcast Advertising Adjudications.  Accessed 21 September 2005.
 Oates, John (21 September 2005) "ASA stamps on Crazy Frog TV ads".  Accessed 21 September 2005.

Mobile telecommunications
Advertising by product
Content advertising
Advertising